The Bible Game is a Christian party game developed by Mass Media Inc. and published by Crave Entertainment. It is aimed at Christians and is "family-friendly." There are a variety of trivia questions related to the Old Testament. The main two modes are "TV Game Show" and "Challenge Games." The latter lets players choose any minigame.

Gameplay
In the Game Boy Advance version players explore different maps searching for demons. When the player finds one, they must hit the demon with their Bible. At this point the demon challenges the player to Bible trivia in exchange for a piece of key (which opens the end level destination, the church). The home console version features a game show-themed party mode where players compete for the most points and play various Christian-themed minigames.

Development and release
The Bible Game was featured at E3 2005 and was playable at demo kiosks. It was developed by Mass Media, Inc. and published by Crave Entertainment. When asked why they chose to publish a religious game, Crave Entertainment Rob Dyer exclaimed that he wanted to try publishing a different kind of game, given the similarity between Crave's catalogue of games, citing games such as Tomb Raider. Dyer wanted to make a nonviolent game, but also wanted to avoid making a preachy one either. Dyer explained that he did not make the game for personal religious reasons; rather, he desired to fill niches that other publishers did not.

Reception

The PlayStation 2 and Xbox versions received "mixed or average reviews," while the Game Boy Advance version received "unfavorable" reviews, according to the review aggregation website Metacritic. G4TV writer Greg Bemis was critical of the game in his review of the Xbox version. They criticized the game show mechanic and felt that most mini-games were of poor quality, though they felt there were a couple that were the exception. CiN Weekly PJ Hruschak called it a "cheesy game show," though felt that it would appeal to young children, and adults will appreciate its "innocent humor." They also felt that the price point made it a good pick for children to enjoy. IGN writer Juan Castro felt it lacked the "biblical depth" to attract religious people, while also criticizing the mini-games as not being engaging. However, they noted that if a parent was looking for a cheap, non-violent game for their kids, they "could definitely do worse." IGN writer Mark Bozon's review of the Game Boy Advance version was critical, pointing out how poor the gameplay is and how many bugs it has. Eurogamer writer John Walker felt that it was "well-presented" and "contemporary in design" but still "shallow." They felt that there was only a small niche of people who might enjoy it. In discussing mainstream Christian video games, Vice author Emanuel Maiberg described The Bible Game as one of the better examples of a game that came close to the mainstream. GameSpot writer Bob Colayco was critical of the game, calling it "mediocre." They felt that it would be a Christian family friendly product and felt they would enjoy its "commercial Christian pop soundtrack." They felt that the mini-games were "basic" and lacking in variety.

References

External links

2005 video games
Christian video games
Crave Entertainment games
Game Boy Advance games
Multiplayer and single-player video games
PlayStation 2 games
Video games based on the Bible
Video games developed in the United States
Xbox games